Muriel Evelyn Robb (13 May 1878 – 12 February 1907) was an English female tennis player. She is best remembered for her ladies' singles title at the 1902 Wimbledon Championships. She also won the Irish and Scottish singles titles in 1901 and the Welsh singles title in 1899. She attended the Cheltenham Ladies’ College, in Gloucestershire from 1893 to 1897 and was a member of the Jesmond Lawn Tennis Club in Newcastle. From 1899 to 1902, she participated in four Wimbledon Championships and reached at least the quarterfinals on all occasions.

She died of "Lymphadenoma 2 years 4 months” and “Exhaustion and cardiac failure” (death certificate) on 12 February 1907 in Jesmond, Newcastle upon Tyne.

Grand Slam record

Wimbledon
Singles champion: 1902
This match set a record for the longest women's final. On the first day of play rain stopped play at 4–6, 13–11. It was replayed the next day when Robb won 7–5, 6–1.

Grand Slam singles final

Win (1)

Grand Slam performance timeline

See also 
 Performance timelines for all female tennis players who reached at least one Grand Slam final

References

1878 births
1907 deaths
19th-century English people
19th-century female tennis players
20th-century English people

20th-century English women

English female tennis players
Grand Slam (tennis) champions in women's singles
Sportspeople from Newcastle upon Tyne
Wimbledon champions (pre-Open Era)
Deaths from cancer in England
British female tennis players
Tennis people from Tyne and Wear